Streamsong Resort is a golf and spa resort developed by The Mosaic Company in Bowling Green, Florida on a 16,000 acre property near Fort Meade, Florida. The resort includes a 228-room hotel and three golf courses built on the site of a former phosphate strip mine.  Fishing on various lakes and clay-shooting are also offered.

Courses
The courses are called "Red," "Blue," and "Black" - Red is designed by Bill Coore and Ben Crenshaw, Blue by Tom Doak, and Black by Gil Hanse. Golfweek magazine named Streamsong the best new golf course in 2012 and put the courses amongst the top 40 public courses in the world in 2013. The site ranks the Blue as 87th in the U.S. and 5th in Florida.

The 4th course named "The Chain" designed by Bill Coore and Ben Crenshaw will be open in 2023.

Scorecards

References

Golf clubs and courses in Florida
Resorts in Florida
Tourist attractions in Polk County, Florida
2012 establishments in Florida
Fort Meade, Florida